Goll is a surname. Notable people with the surname include:

Claire Goll (1890–1977), writer and journalist, wife of Yvan
Heinz Goll (1934–1999), Austrian-born sculptor and painter
Jacob Goll (born 1992), German ice hockey goaltender
Yvan Goll (1891–1950), French-German expressionist and surrealist poet
Goll Woods State Nature Preserve, named after Peter and Catherine Goll, 1836 emigrants from Grand Charmont, France

German-language surnames
Dutch-language surnames